840 Zenobia is a minor planet orbiting the Sun. It was discovered by German astronomer Max Wolf at Heidelberg on September 25, 1916. The origin of the name is uncertain, but it may be named after the Slavic god of the hunt.

Photometric observations of the asteroid during 2006 at the Palmer Divide Observatory in Colorado Springs, Colorado, were used to generate a light curve with a period of 5.565 ± 0.005 hours and a variation in brightness of 0.20 ± 0.02 magnitude.

References

External links 
 Lightcurve plot of 840 Zenobia, Palmer Divide Observatory, B. D. Warner (2005)
 Asteroid Lightcurve Database (LCDB), query form (info )
 Dictionary of Minor Planet Names, Google books
 Asteroids and comets rotation curves, CdR – Observatoire de Genève, Raoul Behrend
 Discovery Circumstances: Numbered Minor Planets (1)-(5000) – Minor Planet Center
 
 

000840
Discoveries by Max Wolf
Named minor planets
19160925